Adam Wade Marcus (born 1979) is an American mathematician. He holds the Chair of Combinatorial Analysis in the Institute of Mathematics at the École Polytechnique Fédérale de Lausanne.
The team of Marcus, Daniel Spielman and Nikhil Srivastava was awarded the Pólya Prize in 2014 for their resolution of the Kadison–Singer problem and later the Michael and Sheila Held Prize in 2021 for their solution to long-standing conjectures in the study of Ramanujan graphs.

History
Marcus grew up in Marietta, Georgia and was a boarding student at the Darlington School in Rome, Georgia. He attended the Washington University in St. Louis for his undergraduate degree, where he was a Compton Fellow. He then completed his doctoral studies under the supervision of Prasad Tetali at the Georgia Institute of Technology. Following his graduation in 2008, he spent four years as a Gibbs Assistant Professor in Applied Mathematics at Yale University. In 2012, Marcus cofounded Crisply, an analytics company in Boston, Massachusetts, where he served as chief scientist until 2015.  After leaving Crisply, Marcus spent five years as an assistant professor in the mathematics department and program in applied and computational mathematics at Princeton University before moving to EPFL in 2020.  He is an alumnus of the Hampshire College Summer Studies in Mathematics.

Awards
During 2003–2004, Marcus was a Fulbright scholar in Hungary.
In 2008, he was awarded the inaugural Dénes König Prize in Discrete Mathematics from the Society for Industrial and Applied Mathematics for his work in solving the Stanley–Wilf conjecture.
A team consisting of Marcus, Daniel Spielman, and Nikhil Srivastava was awarded the 2014 Pólya Prize for their resolution of the Kadison–Singer problem.  He was an invited speaker at the 2014 International Congress of Mathematicians in Seoul, South Korea. The team of Marcus, Spielman, and Srivastava was also awarded the 2021 Michael and Sheila Held Prize for their work in resolving the Kadison–Singer problem and their solution to long-standing conjectures in the study of Ramanujan graphs.

Publications
 .
 .
 .

References

External links
 

21st-century American mathematicians
Washington University in St. Louis mathematicians
Combinatorialists
Academic staff of the École Polytechnique Fédérale de Lausanne
1979 births
Living people
Washington University in St. Louis alumni
Darlington School alumni
Fulbright alumni
Georgia Tech alumni
Yale University faculty
Princeton University faculty